Haplochromis luteus is a species of cichlid endemic to Lake Victoria where it is known from the western park of Speke Gulf and also from the Sengerema region, all in Tanzania.  This shallow water species, is found along gently sloping rocky shores.  This species can reach a length of  SL.  This species was originally described in the genus Mbipia, however not all scientists have accepted such placement.  It may be placed back in Mbipia should a comprehensive review of the genus Haplochromis be conducted.

References

luteus
Fish of Tanzania
Endemic fauna of Tanzania
Fish of Lake Victoria
Fish described in 1998
Taxonomy articles created by Polbot